Senator Croft may refer to:

Chancy Croft (born 1937), Alaska State Senate
George W. Croft (1846–1904), South Carolina State Senate
Theodore G. Croft (1874–1920), South Carolina State Senate